Major General Michael David Conway CB is a retired British Army officer and barrister. From October 2010 to September 2015, he was Director-General of the Army Legal Services Branch.

Early life
Conway was born in Grimsby, Lincolnshire, England. He studied law at King's College London and graduated in 1981. He was called to the Bar of England and Wales in 1982.

Honours
Conway was appointed Companion of the Order of the Bath (CB) in the 2015 New Year Honours.

References

Year of birth missing (living people)
Living people
Alumni of King's College London
British Army major generals
Companions of the Order of the Bath
People from Grimsby
Army Legal Corps officers
English barristers